The Marine Building is a skyscraper located at 355 Burrard Street in Downtown Vancouver, British Columbia, Canada near the Financial District. Completed in 1930, at the time of its opening it was the city's tallest skyscraper and it is one of the most iconic buildings in Vancouver and listed among the best Art Deco buildings in the world. It owes its name to the plethora of fine marine-themed ornaments that decorate it. Because of its iconic architecture and luscious interior decorations, the building has been chosen as the setting of a number of film and television productions.

History
The building was conceived by Lt. Commander J.W. Hobbs, an entrepreneur from Toronto. Hobbs recognized that the opening of the Panama Canal in 1914 would greatly increase Vancouver's importance as a commercial port, and decided that the city needed a grand, iconic building, in the venue of the newly constructed Chrysler Building in New York. The design was assigned to McCarter Nairne and Partners, who had never worked on the design of a skyscraper before. Construction started on March 13, 1929 as reported by a local newspaper:

The building was completed on 7 October 1930. At  (22 floors) it was the tallest skyscraper in the city until 1939. According to the architects, McCarter & Nairne, the building was intended to evoke "some great crag rising from the sea, clinging with sea flora and fauna, tinted in sea-green, touched with gold." The building cost $2.3 million to build – $1.1 million over budget—but due to the Great Depression it was sold to the Guinness family of Ireland for only $900,000. The 2016 property assessment is $90 million.

There was an observation deck, but during the depression in the 1930s the 25-cent admission price proved unaffordable for most. Currently, there are no public galleries in the building.

Inside the massive brass-doored elevators the walls are inlaid with 12 varieties of local hardwoods. All over the walls and polished brass doors are depictions of sea snails, skate, crabs, turtles, carp, scallops, seaweed and sea horses, as well as the transportation means of the era. The floor presents the zodiac signs. The exterior is studded with flora and fauna, tinted in sea-green and touched with gold.

During a renovation from 1982-1989 to update the electrical, mechanical and air-conditioning systems, the "battleship linoleum" (imported from Scotland) in the lobby was replaced with marble. The former Merchant Exchange was also gutted, and is now a restaurant called Tractor Foods.  This building was also the management centre for Oneworld, of one of the three largest airline alliances in the world, from its founding in May 2000 until it was relocated to New York City in June 2011.

In popular culture
The building has often been used in filmmaking and television production. It was the setting for the final scene in the movie, Timecop and it was used as the headquarters of the Daily Planet in the popular television show Smallville and as the Freelancers headquarter in the TV show Continuum. The building was used in the movie Blade: Trinity. It stood in for the Baxter Building in New York City in 2005's Fantastic Four and its sequel, Fantastic Four: Rise of the Silver Surfer.

Gallery

See also 

List of heritage buildings in Vancouver
List of old Canadian buildings
List of tallest buildings in Vancouver
Oneworld

Notes

External links
 The Canadian Encyclopedia: The Marine Building
 Time Overtakes the Marine Building

Art Deco architecture in Canada
Skyscrapers in Vancouver
Terminating vistas in Canada
Buildings and structures completed in 1930
Heritage buildings in Vancouver
Coal Harbour